Shalhoub is an Arabic surname (primarily Levantine) and may refer to:

 Tony Shalhoub, born 1953, Lebanese-American actor
 Michel Dimitri Chalhoub, birth name of Egyptian actor Omar Sharif
 Mohammad Al-Shalhoub, Saudi Arabian football (soccer) player

See also
Chalhoub

Arabic-language surnames